Ahmed Abdul Maqsoud (Arabic: أحمد عبد المقصود; born 23 March 1990) is a Qatari footballer of Egyptian descent who plays as a midfielder in Qatar for Al-Rayyan.

International career

International goals
Scores and results list Qatar's goal tally first.

Honours 
Lekhwiya SC
Winner
 Qatar Crown Prince Cup: 2013

Runner-up
 Qatar Stars League: 2012–13

References

External links 
 

1989 births
Living people
Qatari footballers
Qatar international footballers
Egyptian footballers
Qatari people of Egyptian descent
Al Sadd SC players
Al Ahli SC (Doha) players
Lekhwiya SC players
Umm Salal SC players
Al-Arabi SC (Qatar) players
Al-Rayyan SC players
Association football midfielders
2015 AFC Asian Cup players
Sportspeople from Alexandria
Qatar Stars League players